In His Steps is a best-selling religious fiction novel written by Charles Monroe Sheldon. First published in 1896, the book has sold more than 50,000,000 copies, and ranks as one of the best-selling books of all time. The full title of the book is In His Steps: What Would Jesus Do?

Though variations of the subtitle "What would Jesus do" have been used by Christians for centuries as a form of imitatio dei, the imitation of God, it gained much greater currency following publication of the book.

Chicago Advance, the original publisher, failed to register the copyright in the proper form.  Other publishers took advantage of this, publishing the book without paying the author royalties.  Thus lower prices and multiple publishers led to larger sales.

History
In 1896, Charles Monroe Sheldon began writing the book for his Sunday night services. The story released one chapter a week and begged the question "What would Jesus do?" in the lives of various characters. His work gained notoriety soon after its release, and its finished form was subsequently published in the Advance one chapter per week just as it had been prior to its fame. Its ten-cent paperback edition sold 100,000 copies.

Plot
In His Steps takes place in the railroad town of Raymond, located in Topeka, Kansas. The main character is the Rev. Henry Maxwell, pastor of the First Church of Raymond, who challenges his congregation to not do anything for a whole year without first asking: "What Would Jesus Do?" Other characters include Ed Norman, senior editor of the Raymond Daily Newspaper, Rachel Winslow, a talented singer, and Virginia Page, an heiress, to name a few.

The novel begins on a Friday morning when a man out of work (later identified as Jack Manning) appears at the front door of Henry Maxwell while the latter is preparing for that Sunday's upcoming sermon. Maxwell listens to the man's helpless plea briefly before brushing him away and closing the door. The same man appears in the church at the end of the Sunday sermon, walks up to "the open space in front of the pulpit," and faces the people. No one stops him. He quietly but frankly confronts the congregation—"I'm not complaining; just stating facts."—about their compassion, or apathetic lack thereof, for the jobless like him in Raymond. Upon finishing his address to the congregation, he collapses, and dies a few days later.

That next Sunday, Henry Maxwell, deeply moved by the events of the past week, presents a challenge to his congregation: "Do not do anything without first asking, 'What would Jesus do?'" This challenge is the theme of the novel and is the driving force of the plot. From this point on, the rest of the novel consists of certain episodes that focus on individual characters as their lives are transformed by the challenge.

Norman decides not to print a prize fight, and to discontinue the Sunday edition, leaving a drop in subscriptions. Alexander Powers starts a small meeting for the railroad men, but also discovers the railroad's fraud against the ICC. He resigns his post, and goes to work as a telegraph clerk. Rollin Page proposes to Rachel Winslow, who rejects him, because he has no direction. Later Rachel and Virginia help Mr. and Mrs. Gray with meetings in the Rectangle (an area surrounded by saloons), and Rollin experiences conversion. Later, Virginia takes Loreen, a drunken lady who was earlier converted, to her house, to the dismay of her grandmother who leaves for high society. Jasper Chase, against the "What Would Jesus Do" vow, decides to print his novel anyway. Virginia later uses her inheritance to buy the Rectangle property and also to help Norman's newspaper. Rollin, having a purpose for his life helping people, declares love for Rachel.

Chapters 16–24 shift the action to Chicago, with Dr. Calvin Bruce from Chicago visiting Raymond, and writing what he saw. He then decides to try similarly. Dr. Bruce does a similar pledge. His bishop, Bishop Edward Hampton visits him also. Rachel's cousins, Felicia and Rose are orphaned when their father commits suicide and their mother dies of shock. They go to live in Raymond for a little bit. Dr. Bruce and the Bishop start a work in the Settlement (similar to the Rectangle), with help from Felicia. The Bishop is held up, but the robber realizes the Bishop was the same person who helped him, and he reforms. Some of the characters from the earlier chapters, such as Henry Maxwell, Rachel Winslow, appear to see the work in the Settlement. The last chapter has a vision Henry Maxwell sees, telling some of the future of many of the characters in the book.

Characters
 Rev. Henry Maxwell, pastor of 1st church of Raymond, having been there 10 years when the story starts.
 Mrs. Mary Maxwell, Henry Maxwell's wife. Appears briefly in chapter 1. 
 Jack Manning, a man who lost his job 10 months earlier due to the Linotype machine making him redundant, collapses in Rev. Maxwell's church, and later dies in his house starting the chain of events.
 Dr. Phillip West, local medical doctor. 
 Rachel Winslow, a young woman, cousin of Felicia and Rose, who trades a singing career for singing for the services in the Rectangle. Eventually marries Rollin Page. 
 Edward Norman, editor of the Daily News
 George, one of the clerks for the Daily News, who works with the delivery boys. 
 Clark, one of the managing editors of the Daily News
 Alexander Powers, Railroad superintendent of L&T R.R., later telegraph clerk
 Celia Powers, Georges daughter
 Donald Marsh, president of Lincoln College in Raymond
 Milton Wright, a businessman
 Jasper Chase, an author, rebuffed by Rachel, then conspicuously absent, finally denies his Lord.
 Virginia Page, a young heiress, friend of Rachel
 Madame Florence Page, Virginia's grandmother
 Rollin Page, Virginia's brother, who will eventually marry Rachel. 
 Jennifer Winslow, Rachel's mother, and Felicia & Rose's aunt. 
 Lewis Winslow, Rachel's brother
 Mr. & Mrs. John Gray, traveling evangelists, who work in the Rectangle
 Fred Morris, Endeavor Society president, later works for Norman's paper
 Loreen Carson, a drunken lady, who later dies hit on the head.
 Mrs Brown, Miss Wren, Miss Kyle, schoolteachers in Raymond

People from Chicago

 Felicia Sterling, Rachel's cousin, 19 years old with brown eyes. Orphaned in the story, later marries Clyde
 Rose Sterling, Felicia's sister, and Rachel's other cousin, 21 years old at the time of the story. Later marries for wealth, and dark details obscured.
 Mrs. Delano, a chaperone for young girls. 
 Mr. Stephen Clyde, a carpenter, marries Felicia Sterling
 Rev. Calvin Bruce, D.D., seminary classmate of Henry Maxwell, pastor of Nazareth Avenue Church in Chicago. Challenged by what has happened in Raymond, does similarly in Chicago. 
 Mrs. Bruce, Rev. Calvin's wife. 
 Charles R. Sterling, father of Felicia and Rose. Commits suicide when he loses his fortune.
 Camilla Rolf Sterling, mother of Felicia and Rose, and Rachel's aunt. Chose to marry Charles instead of the Bishop. Dies of shock with the death of her husband. 
 Bishop Edward Hampton, works with Dr. Calvin Bruce. 
 Burns, a person whom Bishop Hampton helped 15 years before. Tries, with an unnamed friend to rob the Bishop, but stops when he realizes who the Bishop is.
 Clayton Price, owner of a saloon by the settlement.
 Clarence Penrose, owner of houses in Chicago. 
 Diana Penrose, his daughter
 Unnamed man, who knew Jack Manning when in Philadelphia, and said he was a good man. 
 Carlson,

Jesus is Here

Sheldon wrote a sequel to In His Steps titled Jesus is Here, where Christ actually shows up and visits the characters of In His Steps, supposedly a few years later. The book is written in much the same language / style of In His Steps, with many of the same characters (and some added ones). This book's recurring phrase, used in description of Jesus, is:  "Like an average man.  Only different."

Plot
Jesus appears quietly at first, to one person and then to an expanding group of people in the small town of Raymond.  He gradually draws more and more attention, including crowds. Jesus goes from Raymond to New York City and then Washington D.C., at points making a public splash, including media attention. The non-stereotypical character of Jesus seems fully capable of supernatural power (not showing up in pictures, for example), but chooses a nondescript mode of presenting himself. He does not appear to do dramatic public acts such as healing, but instead speaks words of comfort or lends practical help. He has views but relays them with understatement. He wears ordinary business clothes, at times blends into a crowd, and is not memorable in appearance. He is humble, practical and personable.  His impact upon lives is not through obvious miracles, but old-fashioned kindness, care, and encouragement.

Literary technique
Sheldon creates a Jesus who is especially gentle on the modern church of his day, speaking generous words of grace and favor. Sheldon offers a nice counterpoint through the skepticism of Raymond's lead editor, a non-Christian and non-churchgoer, who sets the story line of the book.  Sheldon also extends the mystery and realism of his fictional idea by effective omission—the use of third-person accounts, and the technique of delaying and limiting first-hand quotations for more than half of the book to onlookers' descriptions of what they saw. There is also a demure and rapid love story between two characters, blessed by Jesus.

This sequel has a slightly more contemporary feel than In His Steps, in that this cast includes characters who openly declare opposing aims and a mean-spirited skepticism of Christ. By playing its own devil's advocate, through voiced skepticism, and keeping the plot more uncertain, the book and its conflicts become more interesting. A Christian might read the story simply to find out how long the fiction of a fleshly Christ, even of the late 1800s / early 1900s, can be sustained. Issues do gradually emerge through the book that date it, however; the book embodies strong Prohibitionist and Temperance views on tobacco, alcohol, college fraternities, and other questions of the period that do not reflect prevailing contemporary approaches to those issues.

Controversy

Sheldon's sequel, Jesus is Here, was quite controversial in its day.  The author's own foreword to the book alludes to some of the controversy.  Possible conflicts by fellow Christian believers might include:

 The book references the Holy Spirit 18 times as essential to walking in Christ's steps to make social reform, a requirement anti- and non-Christians reformists may object to.  
 The book makes no mention of the Antichrist, who the Bible mentions in the New Testament books of Revelation, 1 John, and 2 John. Other Christian books, notably Frank Peretti's The Visitation (1999), ponder through fiction what an anti-Christ type of visitation might look like on a smaller scale.  In Jesus is Here, a question emerges for the reader:  "Who is this man?" and "Why wouldn't he be a fraud?"

Updated edition of original work
 Charles M. Sheldon, Bell, James S., Jr. (ed.) In His Steps. Cook Publishing Company. "A timeless classic updated in today's language."

See also
  
 Howard Pyle (1903 novel, Rejected of Men)  
 In His Steps (1964 film)  
 W. T. Stead (If Christ Came to Chicago)  
 "WWJD" (2010 Movie) starring Canadian Country Singer Adam Gregory
 What would Jesus do?
 In His Steps (2013 film)

References
The Top Ten of Everything 2002, Russell Ash, Bestselling Books of All Time, pg. 109.

Footnotes

External links

In His Steps: "What would Jesus do?" at Archive.org
 

In His Steps movie (2013)

WWJD movie
In His Steps prequel: 

American Christian novels
1896 American novels
Novels first published in serial form
Novels by Charles Sheldon
American novels adapted into films